"I Know My Love" is a traditional Irish folk song, which was first collected by Herbert Hughes and published by Boosey & Hawkes in 1909, in Volume 1 of "Irish Country Songs" - although the song is likely to be considerably older than that. The book can be viewed or downloaded as a PDF here.

The song is about a woman's love for "an arrant rover" and her jealousy of his other women.

An early recording was done by Burl Ives on 3 March 1941 for his debut album Okeh Presents the Wayfaring Stranger.

It is best known as a single by Irish folk band The Chieftains with The Corrs, released in 1999, taken from their widely acclaimed album Tears of Stone.

James Yorkston and the Athletes also recorded a version of this song on the album Moving Up Country. Liz Madden recorded a new version on her 2010 album My Irish Home. Colin Wilkie and Shirley Hart recorded a version on their 1966 album Songs of Mother Ireland. Other artists having recorded the song include Pete Seeger, The Clancy Brothers, The Dubliners, John Doyle, Seamus Kennedy, and Salli Terri.

The Chieftains

The Chieftains' version features guest artists The Corrs and had been recorded in 1997, while The Corrs were working on their second album Talk on Corners.  At the time it was released, The Corrs were at the height of their popularity. For the single release, the track was remixed by producer Youth. The track was later included on The Corrs' 2006 compilation album Dreams: The Ultimate Corrs Collection.

Europe/Mexico CD Single
"I Know My Love" (Radio edit) – 3:11
"I Know My Love" – 3:51

UK CD Single
"I Know My Love" (Youth Rhythm Remix)
"I Know My Love" (Extended Remix)
"Tears of Stone"

References 

1999 singles
The Corrs songs
Burl Ives songs
The Dubliners songs
Irish folk songs
Year of song unknown